Clare Margaret Mulley (born 1969) is an English award-winning author and broadcaster.

Her first book, The Woman Who Saved the Children: A Biography of Eglantyne Jebb (Oneworld, 2009) republished in 2019 to mark the centenary of Save the Children, won the Daily Mail Biographer's Club Prize. The Spy Who Loved: The Secrets and Lives of Christine Granville, Britain's First Female Special Agent of the Second World War (Macmillan, 2013) led to Mulley receiving Poland's National cultural honour, the Bene Merito, and has been widely translated. Mulley's third book, The Women Who Flew for Hitler (Macmillan, 2017), a joint biography of two women at the heart of the Third Reich but who ended their lives on opposite sides of history, was long listed for the Historical Writers Association Non-Fiction Crown. All the books have been optioned for film or TV.

Mulley is a regular contributor to TV history series for the BBC, Channel 5, Channel 4 and the History Channel, while also contributing to Newsnight, Songs of Praise, various news programmes, and radio including the Today Programme, Woman's Hour and Great Lives and PM.

A seasoned public speaker and literary chair, she has given aTEDx at Stormont, and spoken at the House of Lords, Imperial War Museum, National Army Museum, Special Forces Club, British Library and Warsaw Uprising Museum. She is an honorary patron of the Wimpole History Festival, and also lectures on the women of SOE for the Andante group travel company Historical Trips.

Mulley writes and reviews non-fiction for The Spectator, BBC History magazine, The Telegraph and other titles. She has served as Chair of the Judges for the Historical Writers Association Non-Fiction Crown in 2017, and again in 2021.

Life
Clare Mulley was born in 1969 in Luton, England. In 2006 she graduated from the University of London with a distinction for her master's degree in Social and Cultural History. Her dissertation was on Affection or Affectation: The Role and Rhetoric of Maternalism in the Development of Women's Social Action in Victorian Britain.

Before writing, Mulley worked with Save the Children and Sightsavers International. She has also served as a member of the advisory board of the World Development Movement, a British NGO which campaigns on issues of global justice and development in southern countries identified according to the global North–South divide, and as a trustee of the national charity, Standing Together against Domestic Violence.

Mulley is a member of the Historical Writers Association, Women's History Network, Royal Society of Literature, Biographer's Club, Society of Authors, English PEN, Fawcett Society, Writers Against Racism and National Secular Society.

Clare Mulley lives in Essex, England, with her husband, the artist Ian Wolter, their three daughters & hairy lurcher.

Works

The Woman Who Saved the Children (Eglantyne Jebb)
While working for Save the Children, Mulley was introduced to the life of Victorian-era British social reformer Eglantyne Jebb. Her biography The Woman Who Saved the Children: A Biography of Eglantyne Jebb (Oneworld, 2009).

It was 1919 when Eglantyne Jebb was arrested in Trafalgar Square for distributing humanitarian leaflets, and few in London were sympathetic to a woman hoping to help the children of Britain’s former enemies. Nevertheless within weeks Jebb secured the first donation to her ‘Save the Children’ fund from the public prosecutor at her trial. Five years later, she drafted the pioneering statement of children’s human rights that has since evolved into the UN Convention on the Rights of the Child, the most universally accepted human rights instrument in history. Yet she was never particularly fond of individual children, ‘the little wretches’ as she once called them. Eglantyne’s story is one of passion, compassion and pioneering leadership in the face of national opposition.

The biography was published in 2009, to coincide with the 90th anniversary of Save the Children and the 20th anniversary of the UN Convention on the Rights of the Child. The book was published to critical acclaim and then-UK Prime Minister Gordon Brown called it a "truly brilliant book". Reportedly, Brown read the book while away on holiday and was moved to offer the unsolicited review. The biography won the Daily Mail Biographer's Club prize.

The book was republished to mark the centenary of Save the Children in 2019, has been translated into Korean and Spanish, and is under option.

As noted on the copyright page of the book, all of the author's royalties are donated to Save the Children's international programmes.

The Spy Who Loved (Krystyna Skarbek a.k.a. Christine Granville)
In 2012 Macmillan published Mulley's biography, The Spy Who Loved: the Secrets and Lives of Christine Granville, Britain's First Female Special Agent of World War II.

Churchill called her his favourite spy, and part-Jewish, Polish-born Countess Krystyna Skarbek, aka Christine Granville, was Britain’s first and longest serving female special agent of the Second World War. Despite being arrested more than once, Skarbek used her guile to save not only her own life, but also those of many of her male colleagues in three different theatres of the war. It was her service behind enemy lines in Nazi-occupied France that made her legendary among the special forces however. Not only did she make the first contact between the French resistance and the Italian partisans on opposite sides of the Alps in preparation for D Day in the south, she also secured the defection of an entire German garrison on a strategic pass in the mountains. Awarded the OBE, the George Medal, and French Croix de Guerre, her tragic early death made the papers around the world, yet her true story was kept hidden.

The book received excellent reviews in the British, American, Canadian and Polish press. Nigel Jones

The biography has now been published in Britain, the USA (St Martin's 2013), Poland, Hungary, Russia, China and Italy, and is under option.

In 2013 Mulley was awarded with the Bene Merito honorary distinction by the then Foreign Minister of the Republic of Poland, Radoslaw Sikorski.

In September 2020, after a six year campaign, Clare Mulley unveiled an English Heritage Blue Plaque to Krystyna Skarbek at her last London address, 1 Lexham Gardens Hotel, South Kensington, London.

The Women Who Flew for Hitler (Hanna Reitsch and Melitta von Stauffenberg)
Mulley's most recent work, "The Women Who Flew for Hitler" was published by Macmillan in the UK and St Martin's Press in the USA, in 2017, and since in Poland, Finland, the Czech Republic and China. The books was long listed for the Historical Writers Association Non-fiction Crown, and is under option.

Hanna Reitsch and Melitta von Stauffenberg defied gender expectation to become leading test pilots for the Third Reich during the Second World War. Both became Honorary Flight Captains, and both were awarded the Iron Cross for their service. Yet although both were motivated by deeply held convictions about honour and patriotism, their contrasting views on the Nazi regime meant they ended their lives on opposites sides of history.

'Vividly drawn... this is a thrilling story' wrote Anne Sebba in The Telegraph, while The Times called the book 'popular history of a high order', and The Spectator thought it was 'well researched and beautifully written'. A critic for The Literary Review judged it 'Superb and beautifully written, well paced and full of drama', .

Awards and honours
 Winner of the Daily Mail Biographers Club Prize for biography of Eglantyne Jebb, The Woman Who Saved the Children (2007).
 Awarded the Bene Merito cultural honour of the Republic of Poland (2014).
 Long listed for the Historical Writers Association Non-Fiction Crown for The Women Who Flew for Hitler (2018).

Bibliography
 Clare Mulley, The Woman Who Saved the Children: A Biography of Eglantyne Jebb (Oneworld Publications, 2009) .
 Clare Mulley, contribution to: Carole Angier and Sally Cline, eds., The Arvon Book of Life Writing: Writing Biography, Autobiography and Memoir (Methuen Drama, 2010) .
 Clare Mulley, The Spy Who Loved: the Secrets and Lives of Christine Granville, Britain's First Female Special Agent of World War II (Macmillan, 2012) .
 Clare Mulley, 'Introduction', Xan Fielding, Hide and Seek: Story of a Wartime Agent (Folio, 2014)
 Clare Mulley, 'Remembering the contribution of the Jewish Female Special Agents of the Second World War' in Jewish Lives, Public Service (Jewish Museum, London, 2017)
 Clare Mulley, The Women Who Flew for Hitler: The True Story of Hitler's Valkyries (Macmillan, 2018)
 Clare Mulley, 'Introduction', Bradl (Warsaw uprising Museum, 2019)
 Clare Mulley, 'Introduction', Forgotten Force, Polish Women in the Second World War (The Piłsidski Institute, London, 2020)
 Clare Mulley, 'Historical Context', Lili Stern-Pohlmann (Holland House, 2020)

Notes

External links
 Clare Mulley official website
 New York Times review of The Spy Who Loved 
 The Spectator review of The Spy Who Loved 
 The Telegraph review of The Spy Who Loved 

1969 births
Living people
Alumni of the University of London
British women writers
People from Luton
21st-century British non-fiction writers